The 2020 Pulitzer Prizes were awarded by the Pulitzer Prize Board for work during the 2019 calendar year. Prize winners and nominated finalists were initially scheduled to be announced by Pulitzer administrator Dana Canedy on April 20, 2020, but were delayed due to the COVID-19 pandemic, and instead announced by Canedy in a video presentation on May 4, 2020.

Prizes
Winners and finalists are listed below, with winners marked in bold.

Journalism

Letters, Drama, and Music

Special citations

One special citation was awarded in 2020, as follows:

References 

2020
Columbia University Graduate School of Journalism
2020 literary awards
2020 awards in the United States
2020 music awards
May 2020 events in the United States